Indian Head can refer to:

Coins
Indian Head cent, U.S. one cent coin (1859–1909)
Indian Head eagle, U.S. $10 gold piece issued between 1907 and 1933
Indian Head gold pieces, U.S. coins issued between 1908 and 1929
Indian Head nickel, U.S. five cent coin (1913–1938)

Communities

Canada
Indian Head, Saskatchewan, a town in Canada
Indian Head-Milestone, the local provincial electoral district 
Rural Municipality of Indian Head No. 156, Saskatchewan, the surrounding rural municipality

United States
Listed alphabetically by state
Indian Head Park, Illinois, a village in Cook County
Indian Head, Maryland, a town in Charles County
Indian Head, Pennsylvania, an unincorporated community in Fayette County

Geographical features

United States
Indian Head Mountain (New York), one of the Catskill Mountains in Greene County, New York
Indian Head Peak, in the Glacier Peak Wilderness in the U.S. state of Washington
Indian Head Pond (Massachusetts), in Hanson, Massachusetts
Indian Head River, in Massachusetts
Indian Head Rock, a multi-ton boulder near Portsmouth, Ohio
Mount Pemigewasset, also known as Indian Head, in New Hampshire

Elsewhere
Badlands Guardian, a landscape in Alberta, Canada—when viewed from the air, it resembles a human head wearing a full Native American headdress
Indian Head (Fraser Island), a headland in Australia

Sports usage
"Indian Head" can also colloquially (and controversially) refer to the logos of a number of sports teams that feature(d) a stylized image of a Native American. Prominent examples include:

Teams
Chicago Blackhawks, an American professional ice hockey team
Florida State Seminoles, the sports teams of Florida State University
North Dakota Fighting Sioux, the sports teams of University of North Dakota, now known as the North Dakota Fighting Hawks
Washington Redskins, an American professional gridiron football team, now known as the Washington Commanders

Mascots
Chief Illiniwek, former mascot of the Illinois Fighting Illini, the sports teams of the University of Illinois Urbana–Champaign
Chief Wahoo, former logo of the Cleveland Indians professional baseball team, now known as the Cleveland Guardians

Other uses
Indian Head, Inc., onetime owner of Wayne Corporation, an American manufacturer of buses and other vehicles
Indian Head Ginger, Costus spicatus, also known as Spiked Spirlaflag Ginger
Indian Head Highway, Route 210 in the U.S. state of Maryland
Indian Head Naval Surface Warfare Center, in Charles County, Maryland
Indian-head test pattern, an American television test pattern

See also

Indianhead (disambiguation)